Dan or Daniel Hicks may refer to:
 Dan Hicks (singer) (1941–2016), American singer and musician
 Dan Hicks (actor) (1951–2020), American actor
 Dan Hicks (sportscaster) (born 1962), American sportscaster
 Dan Hicks (archaeologist) (born 1972), British historical archaeologist-anthropologist
 Daniel Hicks, builder and first owner of Governor Charles Croswell House
 Daniel Hicks, player-owner of the West Virginia Wild basketball team
 Daniel Hicks, Vogue Italia cover model
 Daniel Hicks, a fictional character in "Nothing As It Seems" (Fringe)